Van Valkengoed is a Dutch surname. Notable people with the surname include:

Jolijn van Valkengoed (born 1981), Dutch swimmer
Thijs van Valkengoed (born 1983), Dutch swimmer, brother of Jolijn

Dutch-language surnames